Glenn Zaleski is an American jazz pianist, keyboardist, composer, and arranger.

Early life
Zaleski was born and raised in Boylston, Massachusetts. His parents were Bob and Barbara Zaleski. He has an older brother, Mark, who plays the saxophone. Glenn took piano lessons from the age of seven. He played in an elementary school jazz band. While at high school, he had gigs in the Worcester, Massachusetts area. In 2004 he attended the Brubeck Institute's Summer Jazz Colony. He graduated from Tahanto Regional High School in 2005.

Zaleski received a two-year fellowship to study at the Brubeck Institute at the University of the Pacific (2005–07), then completed his degree at The New School. In 2006 he played with Dave Brubeck at the Monterey Jazz Festival.

Later life and career
Zaleski appeared on two trio albums with bassist Rick Rosato and drummer Colin Stranahan.

Zaleski's My Ideal, released by Sunnyside Records, contained both standards and Zaleski originals. Nate Chinen, reviewing My Ideal for The New York Times, wrote that some of the playing was "a little too close to the aesthetic territory of Brad Mehldau. [...] But if there is any unfinished business on this accomplished first outing, it involves a stronger claim to originality."

He played piano and keyboards on violinist Tomoko Omura's Roots. As of 2015, Zaleski is based in New York City.

Playing style
Zaleski acknowledges Bill Evans as an influence on his playing style. Chinen noted Zaleski's "subtleties of touch [...] along with his fluent but unhurried sense of phrase".

Discography
An asterisk (*) indicates that the year is that of release.

As leader/co-leader

As sideman

References

American jazz pianists
American male pianists
Living people
University of the Pacific (United States) alumni
21st-century American pianists
21st-century American male musicians
American male jazz musicians
Year of birth missing (living people)
The New School alumni
Musicians from Massachusetts
People from Boylston, Massachusetts
Jazz musicians from New York (state)